Peter Polansky was the defending champion but lost in the second round to Strong Kirchheimer.

J. J. Wolf won the title after defeating Denis Istomin 6–4, 6–2 in the final.

Seeds
All seeds receive a bye into the second round.

Draw

Finals

Top half

Section 1

Section 2

Bottom half

Section 3

Section 4

References

External links
Main draw
Qualifying draw

2020 ATP Challenger Tour
Columbus Challenger